Stagonospora avenae f.sp. triticae is a plant pathogen infecting wheat and barley.

References

External links
 USDA ARS Fungal Database

Fungal plant pathogens and diseases
Barley diseases
Wheat diseases
Pleosporales
Forma specialis taxa